Pieter Carl Fredrik Thill Iansson Ridderstad (born July 23, 1948) is a Swedish curler.

He is a 1978 Swedish men's curling champion.

Teams

References

External links
 

Living people
1948 births
Swedish male curlers
Swedish curling champions
20th-century Swedish people